Ting Chew Peh (born 1943) is a Malaysian politician from the Malaysian Chinese Association (MCA), a component party of the Barisan Nasional (BN) coalition. He was the former member of the Parliament of Malaysia for the Gopeng constituency in Perak for five terms from 1987 to 2008. At the grassroots level, he was known for being the MCA former secretary-general for fifteen years from 1990 to 2005.

He is also the chairman of University Council for Universiti Tunku Abdul Rahman (UTAR) in Malaysia.

Politics and career
Ting graduated with a Bachelor of Arts degree from the University of Malaya in 1970 and
obtained a master's degree in sociology from the University of London in 1972. He also holds a doctorate in philosophy, which he obtained from the University of Warwick in 1976.

Ting started his career as a lecturer in the Faculty of Humanities and Social Sciences at the
Universiti Kebangsaan Malaysia (UKM) from 1974 to 1980 and was subsequently an associate professor at the faculty until 1987. He joined the MCA in 1981 at the age of 38, but continued to be very vocal on issues affecting the Chinese community, particularly on education and culture and the MCA's role, through newspaper articles.

Ting was elected to Parliament of Malaysia in the 1987 Gopeng by-election following the resignation of incumbent, Tan Koon Swan, who was serving a prison term in Singapore for the Pan-El case.

He was then made the Minister of Housing and Local Government in 1990, a post he held until 1999. In 1990 and 1995 general elections he won the Gopeng parliamentary seat under the BN – MCA ticket. In 1999 general election Ting retained Gopeng with a majority of 6406. He defeated Syed Ahmad Said Abas (MDP) and Abdul Rahman Said Alli (DAP). In 2004 general election, he defeated Dr Lee Boon Chye of PKR with a majority of 14,260 votes.

During the MCA General Assembly in 2005, for the MCA deputy president election, Ting got 738 votes was beaten by Chan Kong Choy with 1315 votes.

In the 2008 general election, his name was dropped together with other MCA leaders likes Datuk Chua Jui Meng (Bakri), Datuk Loke Yuen Yow (Tanjung Malim), Datuk Yap Pian Hon (Serdang), Datuk Wong Kam Hoong (Bayan Baru Parliament) dan Tan Yee Kew (Klang).

In the business sector, Ting was the chairman of the Port Klang Authority (LPK) in 2002 and was questioned on 3 September 2009 by PAC following Port Klang Free Zone losses. PKK's chairman received only RM2,259.95 per month allowance. Each board member gets an allowance of RM500 a month. As LPK chairman. Ting did not get big salaries.

He was also the Independent non-executive director of Puncak Niaga Holdings Berhad.

Election results

Honours
  : 
  Commander of the Order of Loyalty to the Crown of Malaysia (PSM) – Tan Sri (2003)
 :
 Knight Commander of the Order of the Perak State Crown (DPMP) – Dato’ (1992)
 Knight Grand Commander of the Order of the Perak State Crown (SPMP) – Dato’ Seri (2001)
 :
 Knight Commander of the Order of the Crown of Selangor (DPMS) – Dato’ (1996)

Book
The Chinese in Peninsular Malaysia: a study of race relations in a plural society, 1976

References

 

1943 births
Living people
People from Perak
Malaysian politicians of Chinese descent
Academic staff of the National University of Malaysia
Malaysian businesspeople
Malaysian Chinese Association politicians
Members of the Dewan Rakyat
Government ministers of Malaysia
Commanders of the Order of Loyalty to the Crown of Malaysia
21st-century Malaysian politicians
Knights Commander of the Order of the Crown of Selangor